The borough of Tonbridge and Malling, one of 13 local government districts in the English county of Kent, has more than 80 current and former places of worship.  Many are in the ancient town of Tonbridge, the largest centre of population in the mostly rural area, but many of the surrounding villages and hamlets have their own places of worship—including ancient Anglican parish churches, Nonconformist chapels and modern buildings serving a wide variety of Christian denominations. 63 places of worship are in use in the borough, and a further 21 former churches and chapels no longer hold religious services but survive in alternative uses.

The majority of Tonbridge and Malling's residents identify themselves as Christian.  The borough has nearly 40 Anglican churches serving the Church of England, the country's Established Church.  Buildings of many styles and sizes are used for Anglican worship: from the tiny tin tabernacles at Hadlow Stair and Golden Green to the expansive stone-built edifices at East Malling and Aylesford, and from Saxon- and Norman-era churches (as at Snodland and Wouldham) to 20th-century buildings in wayside hamlets and on suburban housing estates.  Non-Anglican worshippers are accommodated in a variety of mostly 19th- and 20th-century chapels and meeting rooms: Baptists, Methodists and Roman Catholics each have several churches, and smaller religious groups such as Open Brethren and Jehovah's Witnesses can also be found in the borough.

English Heritage has awarded listed status to 37 places of worship in Tonbridge and Malling borough.  A building is defined as "listed" when it is placed on a statutory register of buildings of "special architectural or historic interest" in accordance with the Planning (Listed Buildings and Conservation Areas) Act 1990.  The Department for Culture, Media and Sport, a Government department, is responsible for this; English Heritage, a non-departmental public body, acts as an agency of the department to administer the process and advise the department on relevant issues.  There are three grades of listing status. Grade I, the highest, is defined as being of "exceptional interest"; Grade II* is used for "particularly important buildings of more than special interest"; and Grade II, the lowest, is used for buildings of "special interest".  As of February 2001, there were 38 Grade I-listed buildings, 74 with Grade II* status and 1,179 Grade II-listed buildings in the borough of Tonbridge and Malling.

Overview of the borough and its places of worship

Clockwise from the north, it shares borders with the borough of Gravesham, the city and unitary authority of Medway, the boroughs of Maidstone and Tunbridge Wells and the district of Sevenoaks, all of which are in Kent.

Like many Kentish towns, Tonbridge developed along a main road at a river crossing and grew rapidly in the 19th century, but its ancient origins are visible in its castle and the nearby parish church dedicated to Saints Peter and Paul.  Victorian growth stimulated by the opening of several railway lines encouraged more Anglican churches to be built: prolific ecclesiastical architect Ewan Christian provided three new churches, all of which remain open.  One—St John the Evangelist's Church (1841) in the outlying village of Hildenborough, then part of the  parish of St Peter and St Paul—was his first church, and Christian has been praised for his assured handling of Gothic Revival architectural forms.  As well as the new St Saviour's and St Stephen's churches, three unparished mission churches were provided for its growing population and were served from them.  Two survive, but neither are in religious use and the St Stephen's Mission at Lower Haysden is in ruinous condition.  It was a tin tabernacle—a distinctive and cheap type of church building which could be bought from a catalogue and erected quickly where needed.  The heyday of tin tabernacles was the turn of the 20th century, and two green-painted examples survive in religious use in the borough: the Golden Green Mission Church (1914) serves a hamlet near Hadlow and has listed building status, and St Andrew's Church a few miles away serves the Hadlow Stair area of Tonbridge.

The 19th-century Anglican churchbuilding boom in Tonbridge was also prompted by the rise in popularity of Protestant Nonconformist worship, legal restrictions on which had been relaxed steadily since the 17th century.  Independents founded a chapel in the town in 1791, and by the 1850s there were congregations of Wesleyan Methodists, Congregationalists, Strict Baptists, Independent Calvinistic Baptists and the United Methodist Free Church.  In the 20th century, places of worship have been provided for Evangelical, Pentecostal and Brethren worshippers, and the non-denominational River Church was established in 1998 and moved into the new River Centre building next to the Medway in 2003.  Long-established Nonconformist chapels elsewhere in the borough include a Reformed Baptist chapel at Ryarsh, an Evangelical Free church at Dunk's Green, a Brethren Gospel Hall in Hildenborough, and Strict Baptist, Salvation Army and Methodist churches in East Peckham.  Methodism in particular has thrived in Kent for many years, and several small rural chapels survive in the borough—although postwar decline has resulted in several closures, including the Grade II-listed chapels at Aylesford and Ightham.  At Burham, the Methodist chapel took in Anglicans when their 19th-century church was demolished because of structural problems, and continues to serve both denominations.  As Roman Catholic worship became more prevalent in the 19th century—again after legal restrictions were removed—churches were built at Tonbridge and West Malling (now replaced by a postwar building), and in the 20th century a badminton hall and a disused Gospel Hall were bought and turned into churches in Borough Green and Hadlow respectively.

Away from Tonbridge town, much of the district is rural and there are many ancient Anglican churches.  Some villages, such as Addington, Trottiscliffe and Offham, are a long way from their churches; at East Peckham, the centre of population moved and the distance was so great that St Michael's Church became redundant and a new building was provided close to the village.  The small town of Snodland continues to support two active Anglican churches, but Roman Catholic, Methodist, United Reformed and Swedenborgian churches have all closed since the 1970s. The area around the ancient village of Larkfield has developed into a large residential and industrial suburb encompassing New Hythe, Leybourne and Lunsford Park; two Anglican churches already existed to serve the conurbation, but a new Methodist church was provided in 1964, superseding one in nearby East Malling.

Religious affiliation
According to the United Kingdom Census 2001, 107,561 people lived in the borough of Tonbridge and Malling.  Of these, 76.13% identified themselves as Christian, 0.3% were Muslim, 0.16% were Hindu, 0.15% were Buddhist, 0.12% were Jewish, 0.07% were Sikh, 0.24% followed another religion, 15.01% claimed no religious affiliation and 7.83% did not state their religion.  The proportion of Christians was much higher than the 71.74% in England as a whole, and the proportion of people with no religious affiliation was slightly higher than the national average of 14.59%.  Adherents of Islam, Hinduism, Judaism and Sikhism and Buddhism were much less prevalent in the borough than in England overall: in 2001, 3.1% of people in England were Muslim, 1.11% were Hindu, 0.67% were Sikh, 0.52% were Jewish and 0.28% were Buddhist.  The proportion of people who followed religions not mentioned in the Census was slightly lower than the national figure of 0.29%.

Administration

Anglican churches
All of Tonbridge and Malling borough's Anglican churches are administered by the Diocese of Rochester, the seat of which is Rochester Cathedral.  The diocese has three archdeaconries; these are subdivided into deaneries which each cover a group of churches.  The Archdeaconry of Rochester administers three churches in the borough: Snodland's two churches are in the Cobham Deanery, and the chapel at Blue Bell Hill Village is part of the Rochester Deanery.  The Archdeaconry of Tonbridge covers the borough's 35 other Anglican churches.  The Deanery of Malling administers Addington, Aylesford, Birling, Burham, Ditton, East Malling, Larkfield, Leybourne, Mereworth, Offham, Ryarsh, Trottiscliffe, Wateringbury, West Peckham and Wouldham churches, and both the parish church and the Pilsdon Community Barn Chapel at West Malling.  East Peckham, Golden Green and Hadlow churches are part of the Deanery of Paddock Wood.  The Deanery of Shoreham is responsible for Borough Green, Fairseat, Ightham, Platt, Plaxtol, Shipbourne, Stansted and Wrotham.  The six churches in Tonbridge—St Peter and St Paul's, St Stephen's, St Saviour's, St Eanswythe's Mission, St Philip's at Cage Green and St Andrew's at Hadlow Stair—are within the Deanery of Tonbridge, as is St John the Evangelist's Church at Hildenborough.

Roman Catholic churches
The borough's four Roman Catholic churches are at Borough Green, Hadlow, Tonbridge and West Malling.  All are in the Archdiocese of Southwark, whose seat is St George's Cathedral in Southwark, southeast London.  The archdiocese has 20 deaneries, of which seven are in Kent.  The Tunbridge Wells Deanery administers three of the churches: Corpus Christi at Tonbridge and its dependent chapel (St Peter's) at Hadlow, and St Joseph's at Borough Green in the four-church Catholic parish of Sevenoaks.  St Thomas More's Church at West Malling is in the Maidstone Deanery.

Other denominations
About 150 Baptist churches in southeast England are part of the South Eastern Baptist Association, which arranges its member congregations into geographical networks.  Tonbridge Baptist Church is in the Tonbridge Network, and the North Kent Network administers Walderslade Baptist Church and West Malling Free Church.  Providence Strict Baptist Chapel at East Peckham is affiliated with the Gospel Standard movement.  Borough Green Baptist Church and Pembury Road (formerly Zion) Baptist Chapel in Tonbridge have a Reformed Baptist character and belong to GraceNet UK, an association of Reformed Evangelical Christian churches and organisations, as does Ryarsh Baptist Chapel.

As of 2010, East Peckham and Tonbridge Methodist Churches were part of the Tonbridge Methodist Circuit within that denomination's South East District.  The churches at Burham (joint Anglican and Methodist), Eccles, Larkfield, Offham and Snodland (joint United Reformed and Methodist, and now closed) were in the Maidstone Circuit.

Tonbridge Evangelical Free Church is a member of the Fellowship of Independent Evangelical Churches (FIEC), a pastoral and administrative network of about 500 churches with an evangelical outlook.  It is also a partner church of Affinity (formerly the British Evangelical Council)—a network of conservative Evangelical congregations throughout Great Britain.  Borough Green Baptist Church is also affiliated with this group.

Christ Church United Reformed Church in Tonbridge is a member of that denomination's Southern Synod.

Open places of worship

Closed or disused places of worship

St Leonard's Tower

St Leonard's Tower is a Grade I-listed building in West Malling. Resembling a church tower, it was built as the keep of a castle by Gundulf, the Bishop of Rochester between 1077 and 1108. Described as "remarkably preserved", it has been identified by some sources as the tower of a former church dedicated to St Leonard. More recent research casts doubt on this: John Newman, writing in the Buildings of England series in 1969, stated that "[i]n 1198 St Leonard's cemetery is mentioned, and there are later references to a chapel. Yet this is no church tower, but a free-standing keep tower". English Heritage, in its assessment of the structure written in 1993, made no reference to any former religious use, instead describing it as a "former castle ... one of the best examples of an early Norman keep".

See also
List of churches preserved by the Churches Conservation Trust in Southeast England

Notes

References

Bibliography

Tonbridge and Malling
Tonbridge and Malling
Tonbridge and Malling
Churches
Tonbridge,Places of worship